Holodactylus cornii, also known as the East African clawed gecko, is a species of gecko that is commonly found in Eastern Africa.

References

Endemic fauna of Somalia
Holodactylus
Reptiles described in 1930